Maurice Escalona (born 27 January 1980) is an Aruban football player. He plays for the Aruba national team.

Statistics

National team statistics

International goals

References

1980 births
Living people
Aruban footballers
Aruba international footballers
Association football forwards
SV Racing Club Aruba players
SV Bubali players
SV Britannia players